Kanchanpur is a small village located in Rohtas district, Bihar state, India. It is near the historic TARRACHANDI DHAM, National Highway 2.

Villages in Rohtas district